Apple (Skin to the Core) is a poetic memoir for young adults, written by Eric Gansworth and published October 6, 2020 by Levine Querido. In this book, Gansworth talks about his life as an Onondaga individual, living amongst Tuscaroras, and the impact of residential schooling. As he covers these topics, he discusses common slurs against Indigenous Americans, including the term "apple," which refers to someone who is "red on the outside, white on the inside," that is, who looks Indigenous but acts white.

On top of winning the American Indian Youth Literature Award for Young Adult, Apple was longlisted for the National Book Award for Young People's Literature and was a Michael L. Printz Award honor book.

Reception 
Apple: Skin to the Core is a Junior Library Guild book and was generally well-received, including starred reviews from Booklist and Shelf Awareness.

Kirkus Reviews called the book "[a] rare and special read," while School Library Journal called it "bittersweet but ultimately inspiring." Jen Forbus, writing for Shelf Awareness, noted, "With dramatic textual imagery, nuanced storytelling and evocative illustrations, Apple is a stirring depiction of Indigenous life." Booklist's Kay Weisman, stated, "Gansworth’s art, a mix of gouache paintings, photographs, and collages (reproduced in black and white), is interspersed throughout, adding interest and detail. With language rich in metaphor, this is a timely and important work that begs for multiple readings."

The Center for the Study of Multicultural Children's Literature, NPR, Shelf Awareness, and Time named Apple one of the best books for children and young adults in 2020.

References 

2020 children's books
Arthur A. Levine Books books
2020 non-fiction books
English-language literature
Verse novels